Kirsten Frisch (born August 4, 1984) is an American former ice dancer. With Brent Bommentre, she represented the United States at the 2003 World Junior Championships.  Frisch is a four-time National medalist at the Novice and Junior level in 2000, 2002, 2003, and 2004.

Career 
Frisch began skating at age seven. She teamed up with Brent Bommentre around 1998.

Frisch/Bommentre began competing on the ISU Junior Grand Prix series in 2000. In 2003, they won the junior silver medal at the U.S. Championships and were assigned to the 2003 World Junior Championships in Ostrava, Czech Republic, where they placed 12th. The duo was coached by Robert Kaine and Cheryl Demkowski-Snyder. They parted ways at the end of the season.

Frisch teamed up with Augie Hill in the summer of 2003. Assigned to two JGP events, they won the bronze medal in Gdańsk, Poland and placed sixth in Bled, Slovenia. They took the junior pewter medal at the 2004 U.S. Championships.

Frisch announced her retirement from competitive skating in 2004. She continues her involvement in skating as a coach in Morristown, New Jersey.

Education 
Frisch attended Drew University (Madison, NJ) and received a BA in Behavioral Science in 2009.  Frisch went on to complete her MS in Occupational Therapy at Kean University (Union, NJ) in 2015. She is currently working, as an OT, at a sub-acute rehab facility in NJ.

Personal life 
On September 7, 2013, Frisch married Gabriel Albanito.

Programs

With Hill

With Bommentre

Competitive highlights

With Hill

With Bommentre

References

1984 births
Living people
People from Randolph, New Jersey
American female ice dancers
21st-century American women